A Superior Day is a 2022 South Korean television series directed by Jo Nam-hyeong and starring Jin Goo, Ha Do-kwon, and Lee Won-keun. Based on webtoon by Team Getname, this series depicts 24-hour runaway thriller in which only the most superior survives, in which the most ordinary man must kill the serial killer who lives next door to save his kidnapped daughter. It premiered on OCN on March 13, 2022, and aired every Sunday at 22:30 (KST).

Cast

Main 
 Jin Goo as Lee Ho-cheol
 Ha Do-kwon as Bae Tae-jin
 Lee Won-keun as Kwon Si-woo

Supporting 
 Kim Do-hyun as Seo Dong-ju, a private security guard in Parisville who helps Ho-cheol in search of a murderer.
 Lee Seo-joon as Detective Oh.
 Lim Hwa-young as Choi Jeong-hye, Ho-cheol's wife and a former police officer.
 Gyeol-hwi as Jeong-min.
 Jo Yu-ha as Lee Su-a, the kidnapped daughter of Lee Ho-chul.
 Park Min-jung as Detective Chu, fiercely pursues a series of murder cases and faces a new challenge.
 Na Cheol as Min-gi, What kind of relationship does he have with Bae Tae-jin?

Production

Filming 
Filming began at Heungdeok-gu, Cheongju-si in November 2021 after finalizing complete cast.

On March 11, 2022, it was confirmed that actor Ha Do-kwon contracted COVID-19 on the afternoon of the 10th and all filming schedules have been cancelled.

Ratings

References

External links 
  
 A Superior Day at Daum 
 
 Superior Day at Line Webtoon

Korean-language television shows
OCN television dramas
OCN original programming
2022 South Korean television series debuts
2022 South Korean television series endings
South Korean workplace television series